Last Exit to Earth is a 1996 American film directed by Katt Shea for Roger Corman. It stars Kim Greist and Costas Mandylor.

It aired as part of the Roger Corman Presents series on Showtime.

Cast
 Kim Greist as Eve (credited as Kimberly Griest)
 Costas Mandylor as Jaid
 Amy Hathaway as Kali
 David Groh as Bendix
 Hilary Shepard as Lilith
 Michael Cudlitz as Hardester
 Lisa Banes as Elder
 JoNell Kennedy as Hera (credited as Jonell Kennedy)
 Zoe Trilling as Goldfinger
 Cedrick Terrell as Yost
 Rosemary Dunsmore as Delivery Room Doctor 
 Lily Knight as Eppe
 Gregory Millar as Moorhouse
 Robert Peters as First Mate  
 Katt Shea as Surgeon Athena

Production
Shea had made a number of films for Roger Corman then had a hit with Poison Ivy. She said she received no offers after that movie so went back to work for Corman with this film.

References

External links

Last Exist to Earth at TCMDB
Last Exit to Earth at Letterbox DVD

American science fiction films
1996 films
Films directed by Katt Shea
American science fiction television films
1996 television films
1990s American films